The 1958 Belgian Grand Prix was a Formula One motor race held on 15 June 1958 at Spa-Francorchamps. It was race 5 of 11 in the 1958 World Championship of Drivers and race 4 of 10 in the 1958 International Cup for Formula One Manufacturers. The race was the 19th Belgian Grand Prix and it was held over 24 laps of the 14 kilometre circuit for a race distance of 339 kilometres.

Summary
The Belgian Grand Prix returned to the calendar after being off the calendar the previous year, and the 8.7 mile Spa circuit had been slightly modified. The pits had been rebuilt, the pit straight had been widened and straightened and the entire track had been resurfaced. The race distance had been shortened from 36 to 24 laps.

The race was won by British driver Tony Brooks in a Vanwall. It was Brooks first solo Grand Prix victory after his car won the 1957 British Grand Prix in a shared drive with Stirling Moss. Brooks finished 20 seconds ahead of fellow Briton Mike Hawthorn driving a Ferrari 246 F1. Brooks' Vanwall teammate Stuart Lewis-Evans finished third in a career-best finish, the first of just two podium finishes to his short Grand Prix career. The race also marked the first World Championship race start (and finish) by a woman in the form of Maria Teresa de Filippis, who had entered the Monaco Grand Prix earlier in the year but failed to qualify. She finished tenth in her privately-entered Maserati 250F, two laps behind Brooks' Vanwall.

On the last lap, Brooks came out of La Source to end the race, and his gearbox seized as he crossed the line. When Mike Hawthorn was coming out of the same corner to end his race in second, his engine failed as he was coming to the finish line. Stuart Lewis-Evans's suspension collapsed on the way into La Source, and he crawled to the line in third. This race also marked the first points finish for Lotus when Cliff Allison came across the line in fourth.

Classification

Qualifying

Race

Notes
 – Includes 1 point for fastest lap

Championship standings after the race

Drivers' Championship standings

Constructors' Championship standings

 Notes: Only the top five positions are included for both sets of standings.

References

Belgian Grand Prix
Belgian Grand Prix
European Grand Prix
Grand Prix